Dwayne Fields is a British polar explorer and speaker. He is the first black Briton to reach the North Pole, and a presenter for the BBC programme Countryfile.

Early life and education
Fields was born in Jamaica and grew up in the UK from the age of six in Hackney, London. During his early life, he witnessed violent crime, including one incident where he survived an attempt on his life in a rival London estate because his adversary's gun jammed. He holds a degree in Psychology and Business Management from University of East London.

Career
Fields was inspired to visit the North Pole after watching a breakfast television article about Ben Fogle and James Cracknell looking for a third member to assist in their expedition of Antarctica. Though he was too late to apply, his enthusiasm for the project was noted and he was asked to recreate the 1908-9 expedition by Robert Peary and Matthew Henson, which reached what was believed at the time to be the Geographic North Pole. As well as the first Black British person to reach the North Pole, he is the second black person in the world after Henson.

Fields has appeared as a guest on BBC’s  Countryfile''' and Springwatch with Chris Packham. On his Countryfile appearance, he said that he believed that some Black British people do not regard the countryside as "somewhere that’s for them" and undertook his North Pole expedition to show that things are not necessarily impossible to achieve. He was on of the explorers on the series Welcome to Earth and is currently presenting his own series 7 Toughest Days also with National Geographic and Disney+ . His work with youth groups has led him to co-found the WeTwo Foundation'' which provides adventure opportunities for underprivileged young people, their inaugural trip to Antarctica was in November 2022, and he is a named ambassador for The Scout Association.

Awards
Fields was awarded the Freedom of the City of London in 2013.

References 

Black British sportspeople
British polar explorers
Living people
Year of birth missing (living people)